Tobias Levels (born 22 November 1986) is a German former footballer of Dutch descent who played as a defender.

Club career
After his contract with Fortuna Düsseldorf had expired in summer 2014, Levels was a free agent for more than three months. In November he went to trial with 2. Bundesliga club FC Ingolstadt 04 and was subsequently signed for the remainder of the season. Ingolstadt reacted thereby to the injury of their regular right back Danny da Costa. On 31 May 2016, Levels extended his contract at FC Ingolstadt 04 until 2018.

References

External links
 Tobias Levels at kicker.de 
 
 2. Bundesliga: Tobias Levels at dfb.de 

1986 births
Living people
German footballers
Dutch footballers
Borussia Mönchengladbach players
Borussia Mönchengladbach II players
Fortuna Düsseldorf players
FC Ingolstadt 04 players
Association football defenders
Bundesliga players
2. Bundesliga players
German people of Dutch descent
People from Viersen (district)
Sportspeople from Düsseldorf (region)
Footballers from North Rhine-Westphalia
FC Ingolstadt 04 II players